1982 FIFA World Cup qualification UEFA Group 6 consisted of five of the 34 teams entered into the European zone: Scotland, Sweden, and Portugal, Northern Ireland and Israel. These five teams competed on a home-and-away basis for two of the 14 spots in the final tournament allocated to the European zone, with the group's winner and runner-up claiming that spot.

Standings

Results

Goalscorers

3 goals

 Benny Tabak
 Rui Jordão
 John Robertson

2 goals

 Gidi Damti
 Gerry Armstrong
 Humberto Coelho
 Manuel Fernandes

1 goal

 Moshe Sinai
 Noel Brotherston
 Billy Hamilton
 Sammy McIlroy
 Jimmy Nicholl
 Minervino Pietra
 Kenny Dalglish
 Joe Jordan
 David Provan
 Gordon Strachan
 Paul Sturrock
 John Wark
 Hasse Borg
 Bo Börjesson
 Thomas Larsson
 Tony Persson
 Sten-Ove Ramberg
 Jan Svensson

1 own goal

 Gabriel Mendes (playing against Sweden)

Notes

External links 
Group 6 Detailed Results at RSSSF

6
1979–80 in Israeli football
1980–81 in Israeli football
1981–82 in Israeli football
1980–81 in Portuguese football
1981–82 in Portuguese football
1980–81 in Scottish football
1979–80 in Northern Ireland association football
1980–81 in Northern Ireland association football
1980 in Swedish football
1981 in Swedish football
Qualification group
Qual